Jeremiah Cronin (14 September 1925 – 19 October 1990) was an Irish Fianna Fáil politician. He was elected to Dáil Éireann at the 1965 general election as a Fianna Fáil Teachta Dála (TD) for the Cork North-East constituency. He was appointed to the Irish Government on one occasion, serving as Minister for Defence from 1970 to 1973 under Taoiseach Jack Lynch. Cronin retired from domestic politics at the 1981 general election, having been elected to the European Parliament for a five-year term in 1979.

He was born in Currabeha, Fermoy, County Cork, the son of Alice Mulcahy and Sean Cronin. His uncle, Arthur Mulcahy, was a member of the Irish Republican Army, and was shot by British forces during the Irish War of Independence on 22 March 1921. Jerry Cronin died on 19 October 1990, having suffered with Parkinson's disease. He was married to Shelia Sheehan; they lived in Mallow, County Cork, and had six children.

References

External links

 

1925 births
1990 deaths
Fianna Fáil TDs
Politicians from County Cork
Members of the 18th Dáil
Members of the 19th Dáil
Members of the 20th Dáil
Members of the 21st Dáil
Fianna Fáil MEPs
MEPs for the Republic of Ireland 1979–1984
Ministers for Defence (Ireland)
Parliamentary Secretaries of the 19th Dáil
People from Fermoy